The Penang Hill Railway is a one-section funicular railway which climbs the Penang Hill from Air Itam, on the outskirts of the city of George Town in the Malaysian state of Penang. The railway first opened in 1923 as a two-section railway, and the system was overhauled in 2010. The total journey time can take between five and twenty minutes. The funicular train coach travels directly from the lower station to the top, but may stop at other intermediate stations upon request.

History

Construction

The Penang Hill Railway was initially constructed for the British colonial community to enjoy the cooler air of the Penang Hill. The first attempt at a mountain railway on Penang Hill began with a proposal by three British residents, D. Logan, Joseph Heim and Alan Wilson and the formation of a private company in 1897, with funding from the colonial administration. The first attempt used a steam engine and was not funicular, and it proved to be a failure. The line was constructed between 1901 and 1905, but did not work due to technical faults.

In 1909, the Straits government organised a new project, the Penang Hills Funicular Railway. This railway project was designed by Arnold R Johnson, an engineer with the Federated Malay States Railways, based on a Swiss design. Construction of the second railway cost 1.5 million Straits dollars. The 2,007 m-long funicular railway was informally opened on October 21, 1923 for the commencement of a trial operation. After a successful trial period, on 1 January 1924, the railway was officially opened by the then Governor of Straits Settlement, Sir L.N. Guillemard. In its first year of operation it carried 35,201 passengers and made 4,021 trips. The Penang Municipality, George Town managed and maintained the railway from its opening until February 1, 1977, when it was taken over by the Penang state Government.

Until 2010, the Penang Hills Funicular Railway had two independent sections due to the difference in gradient between the lower and upper section, and passengers were required to change trains at the middle station. The upper and lower sections each had two counterbalanced 40-passenger cars, and each section had a passing loop in the middle and intermediate stops. The cars were pulled by steel cable electrically driven with a 500-volt power supply. The railway has a tunnel which measures 79 m (258 feet) long and is the steepest tunnel in the world. It took 30 minutes to go up the hill on the funicular service with a change of train in the middle station.

1977 upgrade

The first carriages were wooden with defined first and second class compartments in each one. The four carriages were in use on the railway for over 50 years until they were retired in 1977 and replaced with the red carriages which had fans and automatic sliding doors. Each of the red Swiss-made carriages can hold up to 80 people, mostly standing. They were in use for over 30 years until 2010.

2010 overhaul

After a series of breakdowns, the idea of a complete overhaul of the system with a new funicular railway was mooted. On 22 February 2010, the 87-year-old funicular railway was closed for an upgrade to a new system at a cost of RM 63 million. New tracks were laid, and new cars purchased to increase the passenger capacity and the speed of the train. A new base station and a public carpark were also constructed. The timber from the old railway track was re-used in the construction of a new four-storey Penang Hill Visitor Centre at the top.

The new train and railway, unlike the railway before 2010, does not require passengers to change trains halfway up. Passengers can have non-stop service in the new blue and white, air-conditioned Swiss-made cars which are capable of ferrying up to 100 passengers at one go. The funicular train maximum working load has been set at 7,500 kg. It can carry 1,000 passengers per hour compared to 250 under the old system.

On April 25, 2011, the new railway system resumed its service, although initially there were a number of technical hitches which caused the service to be temporarily suspended. The train service runs from 6.30am to 9pm daily, and the new car can reach the top in as little as five minutes. The upgrade led to a large increase in passengers carried; in 2014, the number of passengers reached 1.365 million, compared to the visitors number to Penang Hill of around half a million in 2008.

Stations

Visitors can enter the funicular railway at the Lower Station at Air Itam, and the final stop of the ride is the Upper Station at the top of Penang Hill. There are a number of stations along the railway between the Upper and Lower stations - the Middle Station (which is currently open only to residents), as well as the Claremont, Moniot Road, Viaduct, and the Lower and Upper Tunnel stations. Since the 2010 upgrade, the train normally proceeds directly to the top without stopping at the Middle Station. It is however possible to stop at some of the intermediate stations by arrangement with the driver.

The Upper Station has been upgraded with the construction of an extended viewing platform named Skywalk, an elevated walkway leading to a food court, as well as a lift, a cafe and a museum gallery. 

The Lower Station at Air Itam has been improved with a new building with retractable roof and a new multi-storey car park for visitors travelling by car. Visitors can also reach the station on the 204 Rapid Penang bus from George Town, Penang.

Fares & tickets
For Malaysian citizens, the fare for a return ticket is RM12 per adult and RM6 per child aged between three and 12. Senior citizens have cheaper fares at RM6 per person. For non-Malaysian the fare is RM30 for adults and RM15 for children.

The ride remains free of charge for disabled persons holding the OKU card.

Also unchanged are the fares for Penang Hill residents, licensed traders and hawkers and workers, who can purchase monthly season pass at RM24.

Technical parameters

1923-2010
Before 2010, the lower section of the funicular has the following technical parameters:

Length: 
Height: 
Maximum Steepness: 50.5%
Cars: 2
Capacity: 80 passengers per car
Configuration: Single track with passing loop
Journey time: 11 minutes
Maximum speed: 
Track gauge: 
Traction: Electricity

The upper section of the funicular has the following technical parameters:

Length: 
Height: 
Maximum Steepness: 51.3%
Cars: 2
Capacity: 80 passengers per car
Configuration: Single track with passing loop
Journey time: 13 minutes
Maximum speed: 
Track gauge: 
Traction: Electricity

After 2010
Length: 
Height: 
Maximum slope: 52.9%, 27.9°
Minimum slope: 18.8%, 10.7°
Cars: 2
Coach empty weight: 14,500 kg
Maximum payload: 7,500 kg
Capacity: 100 passengers per car
Maximum speed: 
Haul rope diameter: 38 mm
Traction: Electricity
Main drive motor: 710 kW

Gallery

See also
 Awana Skyway - Aerial tramway type, now Gondola lift type
 Genting Skyway - Gondola lift type
 Langkawi Cable Car - Gondola lift type
 Rail transport in Malaysia

References

Further reading

 To the top of Penang Hill (a 1934 article)

External links

Penang Hill Railway official site
The International Steam Pages Numerous images of The Penang Hill Railway before, after, and during the 2010 upgrade.
 
 

Funicular railways in Malaysia
Rail transport in Penang
Metre gauge railways in Malaysia
Railway lines opened in 1923
1923 establishments in British Malaya